Eric Gale (September 20, 1938 – May 25, 1994) was an American jazz and R&B guitarist.

Early life and career 
Born in Bedford–Stuyvesant, Brooklyn, New York, Gale grew up in a diverse household. His paternal grandfather was from Yorkshire, England. He had extended family in Barbados and Venezuela. Gale often visited the U.K. and Venezuela as an adolescent, which influenced his style into adulthood. He was fluent in Spanish.
 
Gale started playing the guitar at age 12. At that time, he skipped junior high school. Soon after, in high school, he visited John Coltrane's home after school and sat in on jam sessions, which inspired Gale's readily recognizable style. Gale received his Master of Science in chemistry at Niagara University. He was also on the football team. Later, Gale was pursued by Frank Sinatra to work on the hit song "My Way", as mentioned in Frank Sinatra's autobiography. Gale decided to pursue a musical career full-time instead of getting his Ph.D. in Chemistry.

A close friend of Gale, Roberta Flack, asked Gale to work with her on the Killing Me Softly album. He had just finished recording his Negril album with the Wailers Band, along with Peter Tosh on vocals, in Kingston, Jamaica. During that period of time, Martin Luther King Jr. and Robert F. Kennedy were assassinated in the United States and it hit Gale hard; he flew out to Montego Bay, Jamaica, to clear his mind and reconnect with nature, then was able to finish an album in Kingston with his friends who understood politics and injustice. This was mentioned in the Aston "Familyman" Barrett's autobiography. After that, Flack called Gale and begged him to come back home to New York to help her with the Killing Me Softly album. Gale was reluctant so she flew the band members to him instead. After some persuading, they ended up returning to the United States. The album was a hit.

Gale often worked as a session musician, recording with musicians such as Gary Burton, Joe Cocker, King Curtis, The Drifters, The Flamingos, Aretha Franklin, Lena Horne, Illinois Jacquet, Billy Joel, Quincy Jones, Herbie Mann, David "Fathead" Newman, Diana Ross, Mongo Santamaria, Paul Simon, Nina Simone, Jimmy Smith, Clark Terry, Bobby Timmons, and Jackie Wilson. In the 1970s he became a studio guitarist for CTI Records, recording with Bob James, Stanley Turrentine, and Grover Washington Jr., and was a member of the R&B band Stuff. His first of many albums as a solo act was released by Kudu.

Gale died of lung cancer in 1994 at the age of 55 and is survived by his wife Masako Murakami-Gale, their three daughters, and two grandchildren.

Discography

As leader
 Forecast (Kudu, 1973)
 Negril (Micron Music; Klik, 1975)
 Multiplication (Columbia, 1977)
 Ginseng Woman (Columbia, 1977)
 Part of You (Columbia, 1979)
 Touch of Silk (Columbia, 1980)
 Blue Horizon (Elektra/Musician, 1982)
 In the Shade of a Tree (JVC, 1982)
 Island Breeze (Elektra, 1983)
 In a Jazz Tradition (EmArcy, 1988)
 Let's Stay Together (Artful Balance, 1988)
 Utopia (Rooms, 1998, released posthumously)

With Stuff
 Stuff (Warner Bros., 1976)
 ‘’More Stuff’’ (Warner Bros. 1977)
 Live Stuff (Warner Bros., 1978)
 Stuff It! (Warner Bros., 1979)
 Live in New York (Warner Bros., 1980)
 Made in America (Bridge Gate, 1994)

As sideman
With Ashford & Simpson
 Come as You Are (Warner Bros., 1976)
 Send It (Warner Bros., 1977)
 Is It Still Good to Ya (Warner Bros., 1978)
 Stay Free (Warner Bros., 1979)
 A Musical Affair (Warner Bros., 1980)
 Street Opera (Capitol, 1982)
 So So Satisfied (Big Break, 2015)

With Patti Austin
 End of a Rainbow (CTI, 1976)
 Havana Candy (CTI, 1977)
 Every Home Should Have One (Qwest, 1981)
 In My Life (CTI, 1983)

With George Benson
 Giblet Gravy (Verve, 1968)
 Good King Bad (CTI, 1976)
 Benson & Farrell (CTI, 1976)
 Space (CTI, 1978)
 Pacific Fire (CTI, 1983)

With Ron Carter
 Anything Goes (Kudu, 1975)
 Very Well (Polydor, 1987)
 Yellow & Green (Epic, 1987)
 I'm Walkin (EmArcy, 1988)

With Hank Crawford
 Mr. Blues Plays Lady Soul (Atlantic, 1969)
 It's a Funky Thing to Do (Cotillion, 1971)
 Help Me Make it Through the Night (Kudu, 1972)
 I Hear a Symphony (Kudu, 1975)
 Hank Crawford's Back (Kudu, 1976)
 Tico Rico (Kudu, 1977)

With Fania All-Stars
 Ella Fue/Juan Pachanga (Columbia, 1977)
 Ella Fue/Steady (Discophon, 1977)
 Rhythm Machine (Fania, 1977)
 Spanish Fever (Columbia, 1978)
 Cross Over (Columbia, 1979)
 Commitment (Fania, 1980)
 Social Change (Dig It, 1981)

With Roberta Flack
 Chapter Two (Atlantic, 1970)
 Roberta Flack & Donny Hathaway (Atlantic, 1972)
 Killing Me Softly  (Atlantic, 1973)
 I'm the One (Atlantic, 1982)

With Jun Fukamachi
 The Sea of Dirac (Kitty, 1977)
 Evening Star (Kitty, 1978)
 On the Move (Alfa, 1978)

With Freddie Hubbard
 A Soul Experiment (Atlantic, 1969)
 First Light (CTI, 1973)
 In Concert (CTI, 1973)
 Windjammer (Columbia, 1976)

With Bob James
 Two (CTI, 1975)
 Three  (CTI, 1976)
 BJ4  (CTI, 1977)
 Heads (Tappan Zee, 1977)
 Touchdown (Tappan Zee, 1978)
 Lucky Seven (Tappan Zee, 1979)
 One On One (Tappan Zee, 1979)
 Sign of the Times (Tappan Zee, 1981)
 The Genie (Tappan Zee, 1983)
 12 (Tappan Zee, 1984)
 Double Vision (Warner Bros., 1986)
 Grand Piano Canyon (Warner Bros., 1990)

With Quincy Jones
 Walking in Space (A&M, 1969)
 Gula Matari (A&M, 1970)
 Smackwater Jack (A&M, 1971)
 $ (Reprise, 1972)
 Body Heat (A&M, 1974)
 I Heard That!! (A&M, 1976)
 Sounds ... and Stuff Like That!! (A&M, 1978)

With Gladys Knight & the Pips
 Still Together (Buddah, 1977)
 The One and Only (Buddah, 1978)
 About Love (Columbia, 1980)
 Touch (Columbia, 1981)

With Yusef Lateef
 Yusef Lateef's Detroit (Atlantic, 1969)
 Suite 16 (Atlantic, 1970)
 The Gentle Giant (Atlantic, 1972)
 Autophysiopsychic (CTI, 1977)
 In a Temple Garden (CTI, 1979)

With Ralph MacDonald
 Sound of a Drum (Marlin, 1976)
 The Path (Marlin, 1978)
 Counterpoint (Marlin, 1979)
 Universal Rhythm (Polydor, 1984)
 Surprize (Polydor, 1985)

With Van McCoy
 Disco Baby (Avco, 1975)
 The Disco Kid (Avco, 1975)
 The Real McCoy (H&L, 1976)
 Rhythms of the World (H&L, 1976)

With David "Fathead" Newman
 Bigger & Better (Atlantic, 1968)
 Captain Buckles (Cotillion, 1971)
 Scratch My Back (Prestige, 1979)

With Esther Phillips
 Esther Phillips Sings (Atlantic, 1966)
 From a Whisper to a Scream (Kudu, 1971)
 Alone Again Naturally (Kudu, 1972)
 Capricorn Princess (Kudu, 1976)

With Diana Ross
 The Boss (Motown, 1979)
 Why Do Fools Fall in Love  (RCA Victor, 1981)
 Silk Electric (Capitol, 1982)
 Ross (RCA, 1983)
 Red Hot Rhythm & Blues (EMI, 1987)

With David Ruffin
 Who I Am (Motown, 1975)
 Everything's Coming Up Love (Motown, 1976)
 In My Stride (Motown, 1977)

With Mongo Santamaria
 Mongo '70 (Atlantic, 1970)
 Mongo's Way (Atlantic, 1971)
 Red Hot (Tappan Zee, 1979)

With Shirley Scott
 Soul Song (Atlantic, 1969)
 Shirley Scott & the Soul Saxes (Atlantic, 1969)
 Something (Atlantic, 1970)

With Tom Scott
 New York Connection (Ode, 1975)
 Blow It Out (Ode, 1977)
 Intimate Strangers (Columbia, 1978)
 Apple Juice (Columbia, 1981)
 Streamlines (GRP, 1987)
 Flashpoint (GRP, 1988)
 Them Changes (GRP, 1990)
 Keep This Love Alive (GRP, 1991)
 Reed My Lips (GRP, 1994)

With Johnny "Hammond" Smith
 Breakout (Kudu, 1971)
 The Prophet (Kudu, 1972)
 Wild Horses Rock Steady (Kudu, 1972)

With Richard Tee
 Strokin (Tappan Zee, 1979)
 Natural Ingredients (Tappan Zee, 1980)
 Real Time (One Voice, 1995)

With Stanley Turrentine
 Salt Song (CTI, 1971)
 Don't Mess with Mister T. (CTI, 1973)
 The Baddest Turrentine (CTI, 1973)
 The Sugar Man (CTI, 1975)
 The Man with the Sad Face (Fantasy, 1976)
 Nightwings (Fantasy, 1977)
 West Side Highway (Fantasy, 1978)

With Grover Washington Jr.
 Inner City Blues (Kudu, 1971)
 All the King's Horses (Kudu, 1972)
 Soul Box (Kudu, 1973)
 Feels So Good (Kudu, 1975)
 Mister Magic (Kudu, 1975)
 A Secret Place (Kudu, 1976)
 Skylarkin' (Motown, 1980)
 Winelight (Elektra, 1980)
 Come Morning  (Elektra, 1981)
 The Best Is Yet to Come (Elektra, 1982)
 Inside Moves (Elektra, 1984)

With Sadao Watanabe
 Morning Island (Flying Disk, 1979)
 Nice Shot! (Flying Disk, 1980)
 How's Everything (Columbia, 1980)
 Orange Express (CBS, 1981)
 Bravas Brothers (1983)
 Fill Up the Night (Elektra, 1983)
 Rendezvous (Elektra, 1984)
 Vocal Collection (Warner, 2009)

With others
 Mose Allison, Lessons in Living (Elektra Musician, 1983)
 Herb Alpert, My Abstract Heart (A&M, 1989)
 Eric Andersen, Avalanche (Warner Bros., 1968)
 The Appletree Theatre, Playback (1968)
 Richard Barbary, Soul Machine (A&M, 1968)
 Gato Barbieri, Caliente! (A&M, 1976)
 Gato Barbieri, Passion and Fire (A&M, 1984)
 Carla Bley, Dinner Music (WATT, 1977)
 Blood, Sweat & Tears, More Than Ever (Columbia, 1976)
 Angela Bofill, Angie (GRP, 1978)
 Angela Bofill, Angel of the Night (GRP, 1979)
 Ruth Brown, Black Is Brown and Brown Is Beautiful (Skye, 1969)
 Solomon Burke, King Solomon (Atlantic, 1968)
 Solomon Burke, I Wish I Knew (Atlantic, 1968)
 Gary Burton, Good Vibes  (Atlantic, 1970)
 Paul Butterfield, Put It in Your Ear (Bearsville, 1975)
 Oscar Castro-Neves, Tropical Heart (JVC, 1993)
 Stanley Clarke, Implosions (Jazzvisions, NEC Avenue, 1987)
 The Coasters, Young Blood (Atlantic, 1982)
 Joe Cocker, Stingray (A&M, 1976)
 Randy Crawford, Everything Must Change (Warner Bros., 1976)
 King Curtis, Old Gold (Tru-Sound, 1961)
 King Curtis, Get Ready (Atco, 1970)
 Fats Domino, Fats Is Back (Reprise, 1968)
 Charles Earland, Revelation (Mercury, 1977)
 Pee Wee Ellis, Home in the Country (Savoy, 1977)
 Art Farmer, Crawl Space (CTI, 1977)
 Joe Farrell, La Catedral y El Toro (Warner Bros., 1977)
 Maynard Ferguson, Primal Scream (Columbia, 1976)
 Maynard Ferguson, Conquistador (Columbia, 1977)
 Aretha Franklin, Young, Gifted and Black  (Atlantic, 1972)
 Michael Franks, One Bad Habit (Warner Bros., 1980)
 Fuse One, Silk (CTI, 1981)
 Dizzy Gillespie, The Real Thing (Perception, 1970)
 Barry Goldberg, Street Man (Buddah, 1969)
 Benny Golson, Tune In, Turn On (Verve, 1967)
 Urbie Green, The Fox (CTI, 1977)
 Dave Grusin, Dave Grusin and the N.Y./L.A. Dream Band (GRP, 1982)
 Dave Grusin, The Orchestral Album (GRP, 1994)
 Chico Hamilton, The Head Hunters (Solid State, 1969)
 Herbie Hancock, Fat Albert Rotunda (Warner Bros., 1969)
 Rufus Harley, King/Queens (Atlantic, 1970)
 Greg Hatza, The Wizardry of Greg Hatza (Coral, 1967)
 Greg Hatza, Organized Jazz (Coral, 1968)
 Joe Higgs, Life of Contradiction (Micron Music, 1975)
 Johnny Hodges, Blue Notes (Verve, 1966)
 Loleatta Holloway, Queen of the Night (Gold Mind, 1978)
 Loleatta Holloway, Love Sensation (Gold Mind, 1980)
 Red Holloway, The Burner (Prestige, 1964)
 Richard Holmes, I'm in the Mood for Love (Flying Dutchman, 1976)
 Stix Hooper, Lay It On the Line (Artful Balance, 1989)
 Lena Horne & Gábor Szabó, Lena & Gabor (Skye, 1969)
 Bobbi Humphrey, Freestyle (Epic, 1978)
 Bobbi Humphrey, The Good Life (Epic, 1979)
 Weldon Irvine, Sinbad (RCA Victor, 1976)
 Michael Jackson, Bad (Epic, 1987)
 Illinois Jacquet, Spectrum (Argo, 1965)
 Al Jarreau, Tenderness (Warner Bros., 1994)
 Al Jarreau, Live at Montreux 1993 (Eagle, 2016)
 Billy Joel, 52nd Street (Columbia, 1978)
 Billy Joel, An Innocent Man (Columbia, 1983)
 J. J. Johnson and Kai Winding, Israel (A&M, 1968)
 J. J. Johnson and Kai Winding, Betwixt & Between (A&M, 1969)
 Salena Jones, My Love (JVC, 1981)
 Tamiko Jones, I'll Be Anything for You (A&M, 1968)
 Earl Klugh, Wishful Thinking (Capitol, 1984)
 Earl Klugh, Life Stories (Warner Bros., 1986)
 Al Kooper, You Never Know Who Your Friends Are (Columbia, 1969)
 Hubert Laws, The Chicago Theme (CTI, 1975)
 Hubert Laws, Romeo & Juliet (Columbia, 1976)
 Lightnin' Rod, Hustlers Convention (Celluloid, 1973)
 Kenny Loggins, Celebrate Me Home (Columbia, 1977)
 Galt MacDermot, Hair Pieces (Verve Forecast, 1968)
 Junior Mance, With a Lotta Help from My Friends (Atlantic, 1970)
 Chuck Mangione, Tarantella (A&M, 1981)
 Herbie Mann, Glory of Love (A&M, 1967)
 Herbie Mann, Unchain My Heart (A&M, 1968)
 Wade Marcus, A New Era (Cotillion, 1971)
 Hugh Masekela, Grrr (Mercury, 1966)
 Hugh Masekela, Home (Moonshine, 1982)
 Percy Mayfield, Sings Percy Mayfield (RCA Victor, 1970)
 Ullanda McCullough, Ullanda McCullough (Ariola, 1981)
 Gary McFarland, America the Beautiful (Skye, 1969)
 Jimmy McGriff, Cherry (Solid State, 1966)
 Essra Mohawk, Essra (Private Stock, 1976)
 Melba Moore, This Is It (Buddah, 1976)
 Melba Moore, Melba '76 (Buddah, 1976)
 Van Morrison, Blowin' Your Mind! (Bang, 1967)
 Idris Muhammad, House of the Rising Sun (Kudu, 1976)
 Idris Muhammad, Turn This Mutha Out  (Kudu, 1977)
 Milton Nascimento, Yauarete (CBS, 1987)
 Oliver Nelson, The Sound of Feeling (Verve, 1966)
 Oliver Nelson, Encyclopedia of Jazz (Verve, 1967)
 Felix Pappalardi, Don't Worry Ma (A&M, 1979)
 Peaches & Herb, Peaches & Herb (MCA, 1977)
 Teddy Pendergrass, TP (Philadelphia International, 1980)
 Teddy Pendergrass, This One's for You (Philadelphia International, 1982)
 Noel Pointer, Hold On (United Artists, 1978)
 Bernard Purdie, Soul Drums (Date, 1967)
 Chuck Rainey, The Chuck Rainey Coalition (Skye, 1972)
 Jerome Richardson, Groove Merchant  (Verve, 1967)
 Tom Rush, The Circle Game (Elektra, 1968) 
 Lalo Schifrin, Black Widow (CTI, 1976)
 Lalo Schifrin, Towering Toccata (CTI, 1977)
 Diane Schuur, Love Songs (GRP, 1993)
 Jimmy Scott, The Source (Atlantic, 1970)
 Doc Severinsen, Brand New Thing (Epic, 1977)
 Janis Siegel, Experiment in White (Atlantic, 1982)
 Carly Simon, Boys in the Trees (Elektra, 1978)
 Carly Simon, Hello Big Man (Warner Bros., 1983)
 Lucy Simon, Lucy Simon (RCA Victor, 1975)
 Paul Simon, Hearts and Bones (Warner Bros., 1983)
 Nina Simone, Silk & Soul (RCA Victor, 1967)
 Nina Simone, Nina Simone Sings the Blues (RCA Victor, 1967)
 Nina Simone, To Love Somebody (RCA Victor, 1969)
 Nina Simone, Baltimore (CTI, 1978)
 Jimmy Smith, Respect (Verve, 1967)
 Jeremy Steig, Firefly (CTI, 1977)
 Sly Stone, High On You (Epic, 1975)
 Sonny Stitt, Little Green Apples (Solid State, 1969)
 Gábor Szabó, Macho (Salvation, 1975)
 Grady Tate, Windmills of My Mind (Skye, 1968)
 Grady Tate, Master Grady Tate (ABC Impulse!, 1977)
 Howard Tate, Howard Tate (Atlantic, 1972)
 Clark Terry, Mumbles (Mainstream, 1966)
 Bobby Timmons, Got to Get It! (Milestone, 1968)
 Phil Upchurch, Upchurch/Tennyson (Kudu, 1975)
 Thijs van Leer, Nice to Have Met You (CBS, 1978)
 Billy Vera, Storybook Children (Atlantic, 1968)
 Harold Vick, After the Dance (Wolf, 1977)
 Cedar Walton, Beyond Mobius (RCA Victor, 1976)
 Clarence Wheeler, The Love I've Been Looking For (Atlantic, 1971)
 Michael White, How Strong We Believe (Electric Bird, 1991)
 Cris Williamson, Cris Williamson (Ampex, 1971)

References

External links

1938 births
1994 deaths
Musicians from Brooklyn
20th-century American guitarists
American jazz guitarists
Jazz-funk guitarists
Jazz-pop guitarists
American blues guitarists
American male guitarists
Niagara University alumni
Deaths from lung cancer
American session musicians
Lead guitarists
Deaths from cancer in Mexico
Guitarists from New York (state)
Jazz musicians from New York (state)
American male jazz musicians
Stuff (band) members
20th-century American male musicians
CTI Records artists